Todd Lewis Harrison (born March 20, 1969) is a former American football tight end who played professionally in the National Football League (NFL).

Harrison was born in Gainesville, Florida and attended Buchholz High School. He played collegiately at North Carolina State and was drafted by the Chicago Bears in the 5th round of the 1992 NFL Draft, the 134th overall pick.

Harrison played for the Tampa Bay Buccaneers and the Minnesota Vikings during his brief NFL career.

Todd has two older siblings, a brother named Keith and a sister named Dianne.

Living people
1969 births
American football tight ends
NC State Wolfpack football players
Tampa Bay Buccaneers players
Minnesota Vikings players
Players of American football from Gainesville, Florida